John Brunton (23 July 1869 – 12 November 1962) was an English cricketer. He played six first-class matches for Cambridge University Cricket Club in 1894.

See also
 List of Cambridge University Cricket Club players

References

External links
 

1869 births
1962 deaths
English cricketers
Cambridge University cricketers
Cricketers from Varanasi